Jovan Vraniškovski (Serbian and ; born 28 February 1966), known as Jovan VI, is the Archbishop of Ohrid, Metropolitan of Skopje and the head of the Orthodox Ohrid Archbishopric.

Biography
Christened Zoran Vraniškovski, he was born in Bitola, SR Macedonia, SFR Yugoslavia. He studied at the Faculty of Civil Engineering in Skopje, graduated in 1990 and enrolled the University of Belgrade's Faculty of Orthodox Theology the same year. He graduated in June, 1995 and then started his master's studies. As of 2008, he has also been studying for a doctoral degree, working on a doctoral dissertation on "The Unity of the Church and the Contemporary Ecclesiological Problems".

Vraniškovski was tonsured a monk with the name Jovan (John) in February 1998. Soon afterwards he was ordained a deacon and then a priest. In July 1998 was consecrated a bishop with the title Bishop of Dremvitsa and was assigned to be a vicar of the Bishop of Prespa and Pelagonia. In March 2000, he was elected the Bishop of the diocese of Veles.

In an interview given in 2020, Archbishop Jovan pointed out that the disputed Macedonian Orthodox Church is not taking good care of the churches and monasteries founded by Serbian rulers, and that many are in poor state. He characterized the behavior of the MOC as irresponsible.

In 2021, Archbishop  Jovan was vaccinated against the COVID-19 virus and he emphasized the importance of vaccination.

Restoring church unity
In attempt to restore its canonical status and gain recognition from the orthodox churches, the Macedonian Orthodox Church negotiated with the Serbian Orthodox Church from which it was separated since its self-declared autocephaly in 1967. These negotiations led to an agreement that was signed in Niš in June 2002 - the Niš Agreement. The agreement was signed by all bishops of both delegations. The bishops of the delegations of the Macedonian Orthodox Church were exposed to severe criticism for signing this agreement, and although they attempted to defend it for a short time, it was soon rejected by the Synod of MOC.

The Patriarch of Peć then summoned all bishops, clergy, monastics and faithful people of the MOC to enter into liturgical and canonical unity with the Serbian Orthodox Church. The Bishop of Veles, Jovan Vraniskoski, and all priests of Veles agreed to respond to this call, and all signed a document of agreement.

On 24 May 2005, Jovan Vraniškovski was confirmed by the Patriarch of Peć to be the Archbishop of Ohrid and Metropolitan of Skopje in accordance with the Niš Agreement. On the same day, there was an announcement of the Patriarchal and the Assembly's Tomos for Autonomy of the Ohrid Archbishopric, with Archbishop John as the Chairman of the Holy Synod of Bishops.

Reactions of the state
A few days after entering in liturgical and canonical unity with the Serbian Orthodox Church, Vraniškovski was expelled from the seat of the Metropolitanate together with the monastic community living with him.

Since then he has been detained by the Macedonian national authorities several times on various charges. In 2003, he was sentenced to five days' imprisonment for "disturbance of public peace and order and resisting a police officer", after attempting to perform a baptism in a church run by the Macedonian Orthodox Church.

In 2004, Vraniškovski was sentenced to 18 months' imprisonment for "instigation of ethnic and religious hatred, discord and intolerance." The verdict stated the conviction relied on three points: 1) he wrote a text in a religious calendar in which he slandered the Macedonian Orthodox Church, 2) he agreed to be appointed as an Exarch of the Ohrid Archbishopric in Macedonia and participated in the ordination of the bishops Joachim and Marko and 3) he officiated at a religious service in an apartment owned by his parents. He was imprisoned on July 26, 2005 and served 220 days in prison before the Supreme Court declared the last two of these three points to be unconstitutional and his sentence was shortened to 8 months.

In 2006, Vraniškovski was again tried and sentenced to two years on charges of embezzlement of a donation of 57,000 euros. Initially, the Court refuted the indictment, but the Court of Appeal returned the case for a retrial. 

In the second trial, the defendants were acquitted of the indictment, but the Court of Appeal returned the case for a third trial. On the third trial both defendants were found guilty, and as a second defendant, Vraniškovski was sentenced to two years' imprisonment, where the first defendant was sentenced to 1 year and 3 months imprisonment. He was imprisoned on 8 August 2006 and served 256 days before being released.

Vraniškovski faced a detainment order for a third retrial of a third case in which he was initially acquitted by the Veles Trial Court in April 2006 on charges of embezzling 324,000 euros from MOC funds while he was a bishop with the MOC. The case was returned to the Veles Trial Court for retrial by the Court of Appeals in Skopje, and he was acquitted for a second time in April 2007. On 14 November 2007, the Court of Appeals in Skopje returned this case to the Veles Trial Court for a third trial. Vraniškovski's attorney claimed that neither he nor Vraniškovski was asked to appear in court to testify in the case. On 17 March 2008, the Veles court issued a detention order for Vraniškovski for failing to appear in court.

Vraniškovski and other members of the Orthodox Ohrid Archbishopric were physically attacked on a number of occasions and the churches they have built or used have been destroyed.

International reactions
Amnesty International found the Archbishop Jovan to be a Prisoner of conscience.

The US Mission to the OSCE in its report stated that The United States is concerned that Vraniskoski's January detention and his ongoing trial may be disproportionate to his alleged offenses and violate his freedom of religion. We believe that governments should avoid involvement in religious disputes.

Freedom House speaking of Jovan Vraniskoski's second imprisonment reported that he has been again arrested ... for his ties to the Serbian Orthodox Church. 

Reporting about the first imprisonment Freedom House writes that the charge was loosely based on the fact that he had performed a baptism and held church services in his apartment. Amnesty International has declared him a prisoner of conscience.. In Freedom House's publications Macedonia received a downward trend arrow due to ... an increase in the harassment of leaders of various religious groups.

Commission on Security and Cooperation in Europe reported that Macedonian officials, in response to the ecclesiastical dispute concerning the status of the Macedonian Orthodox Church, have over-reacted and found the 18-month prison sentence to be excessive and unjustified.

Reactions of the Orthodox churches

The Orthodox churches reacted upon the imprisonment of Archbishop Jovan and appealed for his release. Ecumenical Patriarch Bartholomew I of Constantinople sent a letter to the Prime Minister of the Republic of Macedonia requesting immediate release of Archbishop Jovan.

Patriarch Alexy II of Moscow sent a letter to the President of the Republic of Macedonia demanding immediate release of the Archbishop Jovan.

Holy Synod Of Hierarchs Of The Church of Greece expressed a severe protest for an emergent release of Archbishop Jovan from prison, and for respect of religious freedom in the Republic of Macedonia.

The Holy Community of the Mount Athos sent a letter of support to the Archbishop Jovan, signed by all Representatives and Abbots who are in the common Assembly of the twenty Holy Monasteries of the Holy Mount Athos.

The Standing Conference of the Canonical Orthodox Bishops in the Americas Condemned the Imprisonment of Archbishop Jovan by the Republic of Macedonia and asked for his release.

Metropolitan Herman of the Orthodox Church in America called for release of Archbishop Jovan of Ohrid.

Works

Books
Brief History of the Ohrid Archbishopric (Ohrid, 2007)
The Freedom in the Prison (Skopje, 2007)

Studies and articles
 Ecclesiological Heresis of the Schismatical Organization in R. Macedonia
 Contribution of the Church in the Prisons
 Theological and Historical Aspects of the Church Schism in R. Macedonia and its Overcoming
 The Educational Character of Orthodox Christianity
 Theology and Ecology
 The Theology of St. Theophylact of Ohrid in His Commentaries on the Gospel of Matthew
 The Holy Relics - A Seal of a Sanctified Life
 Baptism and Chrismation
 The One and Many Through an Ecclesiological Aspect
 The Crisis is to Unite the Christians
 A Witness
 A Verdict for the Communism
 The Church is One
 Autonomy or Autocephaly

References

External links
 Biography of Archbishop Jovan of Ohrid on the official site of the Orthodox Archbishopric of Ohrid
 Freearchbishop.com
 "Controversy in Macedonia over law on religious groups", SETimes.com, 10 January 2007

1966 births
Amnesty International prisoners of conscience held by North Macedonia
Orthodox Ohrid Archbishopric
21st-century Eastern Orthodox archbishops
Eastern Orthodox Christians from North Macedonia
Living people
People from Bitola
Persecution of Eastern Orthodox Christians
Serbian Orthodox metropolitans of Skopje
Serbs of North Macedonia
University of Belgrade Faculty of Orthodox Theology alumni
North Macedonia–Serbia relations
Serbian prisoners and detainees
Macedonian prisoners and detainees